Robert Anthony May (born October 6, 1968) is an American professional golfer. He lost to Tiger Woods in a three-hole playoff for the 2000 PGA Championship at Valhalla.

Early life and amateur career
May was born on October 6, 1968. He attended Los Altos High School in Hacienda Heights, California, and was featured in the Faces in the Crowd section in Sports Illustrated at age sixteen in 1984. He played college golf at Oklahoma State University in Stillwater, and was a member of the American Walker Cup team in 1991 before turning professional later that year.

Professional career
May joined the PGA Tour in 1994. He did not win on the Tour, but he finished second three times, including a playoff loss to Tiger Woods at the 2000 PGA Championship at Valhalla, and most recently at the 2006 B.C. Open at Turning Stone Resort & Casino, where he lost by one to John Rollins. However he won the 1999 Victor Chandler British Masters on the European Tour. His career was curtailed by a back injury in 2003, and in 2006 he played the PGA Tour on a Major Medical Exemption. After the 2007 season he lost his PGA Tour card.

From 2008 through 2010, May played primarily on the Nationwide Tour (now the Korn Ferry Tour) along with some PGA Tour events. He lost his status on the minor-league tour after missing 15 of 25 cuts in 2010; he played in only eight tournaments in 2011 and just twice in 2012.

May was in the top 50 of the Official World Golf Ranking for much of 2000 and 2001.

Professional wins (1)

European Tour wins (1)

European Tour playoff record (0–1)

Playoff record
PGA Tour playoff record (0–1)

Ben Hogan Tour playoff record (0–1)

Results in major championships

CUT = missed the half-way cut
"T" = tied

Results in The Players Championship

"T" indicates a tie for a place

Results in World Golf Championships

1Canceled due to 9/11

QF, R16, R32, R64 = Round in which player lost in match play
"T" = tied
NT = No Tournament

Results in senior major championships

"T" indicates a tie for a place
CUT = missed the halfway cut
NT = No tournament due to COVID-19 pandemic

U.S. national team appearances
Amateur
Walker Cup: 1991 (winners)

See also
1993 Nike Tour graduates
1999 PGA Tour Qualifying School graduates
2006 PGA Tour Qualifying School graduates

References

External links

American male golfers
Oklahoma State Cowboys golfers
PGA Tour golfers
European Tour golfers
Korn Ferry Tour graduates
Golfers from California
Golfers from Nevada
People from Lynwood, California
Sportspeople from Las Vegas
1968 births
Living people